Saw X is an upcoming American horror film directed by Kevin Greutert and written by Josh Stolberg and Peter Goldfinger. The film is the tenth installment overall in the Saw film series, and stars Tobin Bell, Shawnee Smith, Synnøve Macody Lund, Steven Brand, and Michael Beach. 

Filming took place from October 2022 to February 2023 in Mexico City and is set to be theatrically released on October 27, 2023, by Lionsgate Films.

Cast 
 Tobin Bell as John Kramer / Jigsaw
 Shawnee Smith as Amanda Young
 Synnøve Macody Lund
 Steven Brand
 Michael Beach
 Renata Vaca
 Paulette Hernandez

Production

Development 
In April 2021, a tenth film installment to the Saw franchise, tentatively titled Saw X, was confirmed to be in development with Twisted Pictures. However, Darren Lynn Bousman, director of Spiral: From the Book of Saw (2021), which released the following month, stated that it was a premature announcement that surprised him and the film's producers, saying:

Josh Stolberg and Peter Goldfinger, writers for the previous two entries of the series, Jigsaw and Spiral, confirmed the script was completed in December 2021. In August 2022, Bloody Disgusting reported the film would be directed by Kevin Greutert, who previously helmed Saw VI (2009) and Saw 3D (2010).

Casting 
In October 2022, Tobin Bell was confirmed to reprise the role of John Kramer / Jigsaw. In December 2022, Synnøve Macody Lund, Steven Brand, and Michael Beach joined the cast in undisclosed roles.  Shawnee Smith reprises her role as Amanda Young.  That same month, Renata Vaca, Paulette Hernande, Joshua Okamoto, and Octavio Hinojosa were cast in undisclosed roles.

Filming 
Principal photography took place from late October 2022 to February 2023 in Mexico City. This location was a departure from the previous eight films which were all filmed in Toronto, excluding the first film in the series, Saw (2004), which was filmed in Los Angeles.

Release 
Saw X is set to be released theatrically in the United States by Lionsgate Films on October 27, 2023.

References

External links
 
 
 

2023 films
2023 horror films
2023 thriller films
2020s American films
2020s crime thriller films
2020s English-language films
2020s horror thriller films
2020s serial killer films
American crime thriller films
American horror thriller films
American serial killer films
American sequel films
Films directed by Kevin Greutert
Films shot in Mexico City
Films with screenplays by Josh Stolberg
Lionsgate films
Saw (franchise) films
Torture in films
Upcoming films
Upcoming sequel films